The Charlton Athletic Academy refers to the teams and players in the youth system of English professional football club Charlton Athletic; they play the majority of their home games at the club's training ground in New Eltham, London.

The Under-23 Development side consists mainly of Charlton's academy players who are aiming to break into the first team squad and in the near future, while senior players occasionally play when returning from injury. The current senior professional development coach for the under-23 squad is Hamza Serrar. They compete in the Professional Development League, League 2; the club's Under-18 team plays in the same category of the lower age group.

Reserve team history
From 1999 until 2007, Charlton Reserves were members of the FA Premier Reserve League Southern; however, due to the relegation of the first team at the end of the 2006/2007 season from the Premier League to the Football League Championship, they were demoted to the Football Combination Central where they played against other Football League reserve teams and successful Football Conference reserve sides. At the end of the 2008–09 season the first team were again relegated to Football League One and the reserve side was dissolved as a competitive team.

Under Glynn Snodin
In 1999 the team joined the FA Premier Reserve League Southern. Led by reserve-team coach Glynn Snodin had relative success in their first season, finishing 2nd, however in comparison the next 3 seasons were disappointing as the club finished 8th, 7th & 7th respectively. After this however things picked up, and Charlton became unexpected winners of the league in 2003/2004, and this was then followed by a second success at the Charlton team won the division again in 2004/2005, just a season later. This was followed by another good season, seeing the Addicks finish fourth, however popular reserve-team coach Snodin left to join Southampton as first-team coach. Snodin was replaced by Mark Robson for the remainder; however, this was short-lived as Charlton faced a managerial re-shuffle after the resignation of Alan Curbishley, Mervyn Day and Keith Peacock.

Under Mark Kinsella
With the installation of Iain Dowie as head-coach, Robson was moved to development coach, working with both the Reserve & First Team sides, however after Dowie was fired he was named assistant head-coach, under Les Reed. Mark Kinsella replaced Robson as development coach until this hiring of current club manager Alan Pardew when Kinsella was moved to reserve-team coach. Despite a hectic season the team still managed to finish 6th, however due to the relegation of the first-team the club were demoted to the Football Combination Central where after spending much of the season top of the table were pipped to the post by Southampton F.C. Reserves on the last game of the season.

In 2008 Mark Kinsella moved to a more senior role within the first team under Caretaker manager Phil Parkinson while the club sought after a replacement for Alan Pardew, who parted company with the club 22 November 2008. He was replaced by the club's U18 Youth Coach, Damian Matthew, for the interim period. When Parkinson assumed the role of first team manager Matthew was designated Development coach, based on the same role Mark Robson had held previously.

In 2009 the reserve team was disbanded as a competitive side. With the relegation of the first team from the Football League Championship to the Football League One it was decided that the team would no longer play in the Football Combination and instead only played a number of friendly matches throughout the season.

Home ground

In the last 9 years the reserves had many different stadia. In their first season they played their matches at Welling United's ground, Park View Road, but the stay was short-lived. For the 2000/2001 season the reserve team played their matches at the first-team's ground, The Valley, however when there was a clash in matches the reserve teams would play their games at Park View Road. This system continued until the 2006/2007 season, when the team moved their matches to Gravesend & Northfleet's ground, Stonebridge Road. The reserve team continued to play their games there in the 2007/2008 season, after the change of club name from Gravesend & Northfleet F.C. to Ebbsfleet United F.C.

Reserve team managers

Recent reserves seasons

Under-21s squad

Current squad

Academy history
The Charlton Athletic Youth Academy was a development of Charlton's commitment to develop young players, a scheme which started in the early-mid-1990s when there was an explosion of young talent under joint managers Steve Gritt. Notable players such as Scott Minto, Kim Grant, Anthony Barness, Lee Bowyer, Richard Rufus, Linvoy Primus, Shaun Newton, Jermain Defoe, Jlloyd Samuel, Jamie Stuart, Kevin Lisbie, Paul Konchesky & Scott Parker all came through the ranks.

This was followed by the creation of the Youth Academy in 1998, aiming to find the best local, and worldwide talent to bring to Charlton at a young age. There are 13 players playing in the top 2 tiers of English football who began their footballing career at the Charlton Youth Academy, including Arsenal's Carl Jenkinson, Bournemouth's Harry Arter, Huddersfield's Tareiq Holmes-Dennis & Kasey Palmer, Norwich's Michael Turner, Newcastle's Robert Elliot & Jonjo Shelvey, QPR's Jordan Cousins, Reading's Callum Harriott, West Ham's Darren Randolph, Liverpool's Joe Gomez, Everton's Ademola Lookman and Sheffield Wednesday's Morgan Fox as well as 5 current Charlton first team players Dillon Phillips, Ezri Konsa, Karlan Ahearne-Grant, Chris Solly and Harry Lennon,.

The Under-18 team play in the U18 Professional Development League 2 however the academy takes boys from the ages of 9 upwards.

Valley Gold
The Valley Gold scheme was previously set up to aid Charlton's return to The Valley. When a supporter signs up to the scheme, they now have the opportunity to win up to £15,000 at half-time on home match days, as well as getting £15 off the price of their season ticket and the opportunity to have first priority to away games or high demand home matches.

Since Charlton's return to the Valley in December 1992 the scheme has since used to give financial support to the Charlton Youth Academy, to help nurture Charlton stars of the future.

Under 18s squad

Current squad

Coaching staff

Notable players

National Team Caps
NB: Bold players are playing for Charlton Athletic.

 Semi Ajayi Nigeria U20
 Wassim Aouachria Algeria U18
 Harry Arter Republic of Ireland U17/U19/Republic of Ireland
 Ade Azeez England U19
 Grant Basey Wales U17/19/21
 Daniel Bowry Antigua and Barbuda
 Lee Bowyer England U18/21/England
 Jason Brown Wales U21/Wales
 Jamal Campbell-Ryce Jamaica
 Michael Carvill Northern Ireland U21
 Regan Charles-Cook Grenada
 Jordan Cousins England U16/17/18/20 & Jamaica 
 Harry Doherty Republic of Ireland U17
 Archie Edwards England U16/17
 Rob Elliot Republic of Ireland U19/Republic of Ireland
 Simon Ford Jamaica 
 Morgan Fox Wales U21
 Hady Ghandour Lebanon U16/19/Lebanon
 Joe Gomez England U16/17/19/21/England
 Karlan Grant England U17/18/19
 Kim Grant Ghana
 Ruairi Harkin Republic of Ireland U16/17/19
 Callum Harriott England U19 & Guyana
 Tareiq Holmes-Dennis England U18
 Carl Jenkinson England U17/U21/England & Finland U19/21
 Mikhail Kennedy Northern Ireland U17/19/21
 Paul Konchesky England U18/21/England
 Ezri Konsa England U20/21
 Kevin Lisbie Jamaica 
 Ademola Lookman England U19/20/21 & Nigeria
 Stacy Long England U16/17/18/19/20
 Sean McGinty Republic of Ireland U17/19/21
 Dimitar Mitov Bulgaria U16/17/19
 Keiran Murtagh Ireland U17 & Antigua and Barbuda
 Shaun Newton England U21
 Kevin Nicholls England U18/20
 Kasey Palmer England U17/18/20/21 & Jamaica
 Scott Parker England U16/18/21/England
 Diego Poyet England U16/17 & Uruguay U20
 Darren Randolph Republic of Ireland U21/Republic of Ireland
 Richard Rufus England U21
 Lloyd Sam England U20 & Ghana
 Osei Sankofa England U16/17/18/19/20
 Jonjo Shelvey England U16/17/19/21/England
 Tobi Sho-Silva England U18
 Chris Solly England U16/17
 Alex Stavrinou Cyprus U17
 Jamie Stuart England U18/21
 Tamer Tuna Turkey U19
 Daniel Uchechi Nigeria U20/23
 James Walker England U18 & Antigua and Barbuda
 Myles Weston England U16/17/18/19 & Antigua and Barbuda
 Josh Wright England U16/17/18/19
 Rashid Yussuff England U16/17/18

Other academy graduates
NB: Bold players are playing for Charlton Athletic.
 
 Kasim Aidoo
 Nathan Ashton
 Aaron Barnes
 Anthony Barness 
 Steve Brown 
 Mason Burstow 
 Dean Chandler 
 Jordan Cousins
 Ben Dempsey
 Alfie Doughty
 Jonathan Fortune 
 Barry Fuller
 Adam Gross
 Brandon Hanlan
 Alistair John 
 Jason Lee 
 Harry Lennon 
 Paul Linger 
 Sam Long
 Neil McCafferty 
 Charlie MacDonald 
 Yado Mambo 
 Ollie Muldoon
 Harry Pell 
 Dillon Phillips 
 Joe Pigott 
 Johl Powell
 Linvoy Primus 
 Junior Quitirna
 Onome Sodje
 Donovan Simmonds
 Paul Sturgess 
 Jason Tindall 
 Aswad Thomas 
 Michael Turner
 Josh Umerah 
 Alex Varney 
 James Vennings 
 Scott Wagstaff
 Freddie Warren 
 Lawrie Wilson
 Brendan Wiredu

Honours

Reserve team/Under-23s

Youth

References

External links
 Charlton Athletic Official Website
 Reserve Team Fixtures & Results at the Charlton Athletic Official Website
 Charlton Athletic Youth Academy Webpage
 Charlton Academy Squad Profiles

Charlton Athletic F.C.
Metropolitan League
Aetolian League (football)
Football academies in England
1998 establishments in England
London League (football)